The Deployable Operations Group (DOG) was a United States Coast Guard command that provided properly equipped, trained and organized Deployable Specialized Forces (DSF), which still exist today, to the Coast Guard, United States Department of Homeland Security (DHS), United States Department of Defense (DoD) and inter-agency operational and tactical commanders. Formerly headquartered in Arlington, Virginia, it was established on 20 July 2007, and was commanded by a captain and was decommissioned by the Commandant of the Coast Guard, Admiral Robert Papp on 1 October 2013, although many of the units existed long before the 2007 commissioning. Upon decommissioning, the units previously assigned to the DOG were split between Coast Guard Pacific and Atlantic Area commands.

From 2007 to 2013, the DOG deployed throughout the world in support of national interests and requirements as tailored and integrated force packages. This included response to the 2010 Haiti earthquake, in support of the Deepwater Horizon oil spill in the Gulf of Mexico, and more recently deploying specialized counter piracy boarding teams to the Middle East to combat piracy operations.

The DOG's purpose was to develop systems and processes for standardized training, equipment, organization, planning, and scheduling of rapidly deployable specialized forces to execute mission objectives in support of tactical and operational commanders.

The DOG was the Coast Guard's special operations element, but it was not part of United States Special Operations Command (USSOCOM) because the Coast Guard does not operate under the Department of Defense. Missions of DOG or current DSF units include high-risk, high-profile tasks such as counter-terrorism, diving operations, intelligence-cued boarding operations, Visit, Board, Search, and Seizure, threat assessments involving nuclear, and biological, or chemical weapons, as well as detecting and, if necessary, stopping or arresting submerged divers.

The DOG also had health services technicians and paramedics who were attached to medical teams operating within differing commands. These technicians supported roles in Afghanistan, Iraq, and other areas with Navy and Department of Defense groups.

The DOG managed Coast Guard personnel assigned to the Navy Expeditionary Combat Command (NECC). It was also involved in the selection of Coast Guard candidates to attend United States Naval Special Warfare training and serve with Navy SEAL teams.  While the program is currently suspended there are still several Coast Guardsmen serving on SEAL teams.

DOG units 
DOG deployable specialized forces (DSF) was composed of approximately 3,000 Coast Guard personnel, including the following unit types:

Port Security Units (PSU) 
The Port Security program of the Coast Guard can be traced back all the way back to 1917 with the passage of the Espionage Act and due to the Black Tom explosion. Port Security Units are deployable expeditionary force protection. Unlike any other Coast Guard Units, Port Security Units are the only deployable unit, with the ability to deploy within 96 hours of a crisis and establish operations within 24 hours of arrival. PSU’s are the only Coast Guard unit that uniquely train and provide ground combat security capability for the Coast Guard if needed.  or abroad in support of various Department of Defense operations.

Port Security units are trained and equipped to provide:

 Physical Security
 Ground Combat
 Counter-Piracy
 Maritime Interdiction
 Military Combat Operations
 Humanitarian Response
 Point defense of strategic shipping, designated critical infrastructure, and high value assets.

Tactical Law Enforcement Teams (TACLET) 

Tactical Law Enforcement Teams provide specialized Law Enforcement Detachments (LEDET) to conduct counter-narcotics law enforcement and Maritime Interdiction Operations from U.S. and allied naval vessels. There are currently two units, Tactical Law Enforcement Team South based in Opa-locka, Florida and the Pacific Area Tactical Law Enforcement Team (PACTACLET) based in San Diego, California.  The Coast Guard formally established the Law Enforcement Detachment program in 1982. Originally, LEDETs operated directly under Coast Guard “groups,” local commands that operated under Coast Guard districts.

TACLET groups duties include:

 maritime interdiction missions
 counter-piracy
 military combat operations
 alien migration interdiction
 military force protection
 counter terrorism
 homeland security
 humanitarian response

Maritime Safety & Security Teams (MSST) 

Maritime Safety and Security Teams (MSSTs) are counter-terrorism (Force-Presence) units created under the Maritime Transportation Security Act of 2002 (MTSA) in response to the terrorist attacks of September 11, 2001. The eleven MSSTs provide both waterborne and shore-side counter-terrorism and force protection for strategic shipping, high interest vessels, and critical infrastructure. MSSTs are a quick response force capable of rapid worldwide deployment via air, ground or sea transportation in response to changing threat conditions and evolving Maritime Homeland Security (MHS) mission requirements. Multi-mission capability facilitates augmentation for other selected Coast Guard missions. Other federal agencies that MSSTs train with are the Navy's Special Boat Teams, FBI, and local SWAT Teams.

MSST special capabilities include:

Waterside Security
Maritime Law Enforcement
K9 explosive detection teams

Maritime Security Response Team (MSRT) 

Maritime Security Response Team (MSRT) has existed in different incarnations, but was formally established in 2006. It is one of two units within the Coast Guard that has counter-terrorism capabilities to conduct action against hostile targets. The first is based in Chesapeake, Virginia, the second is based in San Diego, California. The MSRT is trained to be the first response unit to potential terrorist threats, deny preemptive terrorist actions, execute security actions against armed hostiles and/or non-compliant threats, participate in port level counter-terrorism exercises, execute tactical facility entry, and educate other forces on Coast Guard's counter-terrorism procedures. Although the MSRT's focus is primarily on the safety and security of homeland defense, it is capable of rapidly deploying worldwide in response to incidents. Other specialized units and federal agencies that MSRTs routinely train with are the Special Warfare Combatant-craft Crewman (SWCC), Helicopter Sea Combat Squadrons, SEAL teams and Explosive Ordnance Disposal (EOD) of the Navy, Maritime Raid Force of the Marine Corps, Special Mission Units, the Secret Service, Federal Bureau of Investigation (FBI), the Border Patrol's BORTAC, and the Customs and Border Protection Special Response Teams (SRT). Their motto, as seen on their unit patch, is "Nox Noctis est Nostri", which translates from Latin to English is "The Night is Ours".

MSRT Special Capabilities include:

Counter-terrorism (CT)
Direct Action (DA)
Advanced Interdiction (AI)
Hostage Rescue/Personnel Recovery
Small Unit Tactics
Counter Assault
Tactical Maritime Law Enforcement
Medium to High risk boarding (Level III & IV) “VBSS”
Airborne Use of Force (AUF)
K9 explosive detection teams
CBRNE
 Dive lockers (only MSRT West)

MSRT members are selected through experienced maritime law enforcement members, often selected from MSST and TACLET teams. Many of these members are already highly trained and qualified when selected. Elements of the MSRT's primary assault force are known as a Direct Action Section (DAS). Members of a DAS may include a Team Leader, Comms/JTAC's, Breachers, Medics, Precision Marksmen, Observation members (snipers/observers), and team members trained to identify Chemical, Biological, Nuclear, Radiological (CBRN) threats. These assault force teams train extensively in advanced close quarters combat and advanced combat marksmanship. They are well-trained to quickly and surreptitiously board suspicious vessels, secure gas and oil platforms or secure land-based targets by fast-roping from helicopters or using other undisclosed methods to neutralize enemy personnel. The Tactical Delivery Team (TDT) and the boat assault force are trained in advanced vessel delivery tactics and stealthy delivery of the main assault force (DAS) as well as follow on forces.

National Strike Force (NSF) 
The National Strike Force (NSF) was established in 1973 as a direct result of the Federal Water Pollution Control Act of 1972. The NSF provides highly trained, experienced personnel and specialized equipment to Coast Guard and other federal agencies to facilitate preparedness for and response to oil discharges, hazardous materials releases, and weapons of mass destruction (WMD) incidents.

The National Strike Force (NSF) includes five units with over 200 active duty, civilian, reserve, and auxiliary personnel. It is commanded by a captain.

 The National Strike Force Coordination Center (NSFCC) provides support and standardization guidance to the three strike teams.
 Each Strike Team is a highly trained cadre of Coast Guardsmen who maintain and rapidly deploy with specialized equipment and incident management skills wherever needed. The strike teams are recognized worldwide as expert authorities in the preparation for and response to the effects resulting from oil discharges, hazardous substance releases, weapons of mass destruction events, and other emergencies on behalf of the American public. There are three strike teams within the NSF. The Atlantic Strike Team is based at Fort Dix, New Jersey, the Gulf Strike Team is based at the Coast Guard Aviation Training Center in Mobile, Alabama, and the Pacific Strike Team is based at Novato, California.
 The Public Information Assistance Team (PIAT) provides emergency public information services to Federal On-Scene Coordinators primarily during oil spills and hazardous material releases. It is located at the National Strike Force Coordination Center.

Regional Dive Lockers 
The DOG has two Regional Dive Lockers that provide full-time diving capability for three primary missions: Ports and Waterways Coastal Security (PWCS); Aids to Navigation (ATON); and ship husbandry and repair in remote polar regions. The Dive Lockers, which became fully operational on October 1, 2008 following a cold water familiarization diving accident in the Arctic aboard U.S. Coast Guard Cutter Healy.   Regional Dive Locker East (RDLE) is located at Portsmouth, Virginia, Regional Dive Locker West (RDLW) is located at San Diego, California or Regional Dive locker Pacific (RDLP) which is located in Honolulu, Hawaii.

Naval Coastal Warfare
Naval Coastal Warfare (NCW) 
These Coast Guard units are part of an interoperable force and are part of the Department of Defense international and domestic security. Similar to PSU’s they provide anti-terrorism / force protection for forward deployed base camps and ports around the world where needed. Coast Guard billets assigned to NCW Groups support NECC expeditionary ops.

Physical Fitness For (DOG) 
The Deployable Operations group fell into three levels of physical fitness. This test was very similar to the FBI test or applying to a local or state police agencies SWAT team.

The Tier One Fitness test is:

The Tier Two fitness is:

See also 

Helicopter Interdiction Tactical Squadron
Joint Maritime Training Center
Naval Expeditionary Combat Command
Patrol Forces Southwest Asia
U.S. Border Patrol Special Operations Group
United States Naval Special Warfare Command
United States special operations forces
United States Special Operations Command

References

Further reading

External links
 
 Guard D.O.G.s Training

 
United States Coast Guard
United States Department of Homeland Security